Imponderables (from Latin imponderabilis - unweighable) may refer to;

 Imponderables (book series)
 The Imponderables - Canadian sketch comedy troupe
 Imponderable fluid
 Acinteyya and The unanswered questions (Buddhism)

de:Imponderabilien
sv:Imponderabilia